And So to Bentley was a British BBC comedy television series, aired in 1954. The scripts were written by Denis Norden and Frank Muir. Six episodes were produced, starring 
Dick Bentley, Peter Sellers, Rosemary Miller, Charlotte Mitchel and Herbert Mostyn. The series was regarded as a flop.

Herbert Mostyn was a notional BBC voice actor, created by Muir and Norden, for convenience when they took small acting parts in the BBC radio comedy programmes they had written (and thus earned acting as well as writing fees).  Herbert Mostyn was listed in the performing credits for countless BBC radio programs, as Norden admitted in a radio interview of 2013, but otherwise never existed.

References

British comedy television shows
1950s British comedy television series
1954 British television series debuts
1954 British television series endings